Shigeaki Sugeta (Yamaguchi-Ken, born 2 June 1933) is a Japanese linguist. Emeritus professor of General, Romance and Italian Linguistics at the University of Waseda, and now advisor to the Institute of Italian Studies of the same university, is the author of the first ever Sardinian-Japanese vocabulary.

Biography 
Born in Yamaguchi-Ken, Shigeaki Sugeta graduated in Literature in 1957 from the Department of English Language and Literature at Waseda University in Tokyo, and again in Literature in 1959 in the Department of Glotology from the University of Tokyo.

From 1962 to 1964 he was a scholarship holder of the Italian government at the University of Florence, where he attended Bruno Migliorini's lessons. In 1964, for the first time, he arrived in Sardinia and began studying the Sardinian language. During the years he travelled to Sardinia many other times, talking in fluent Sardinian with the locals.

From 1993 to 1997 he was Director of the Japanese Society of Romance Linguistics (Societas Japonica Studiorum Romanicorum), and he taught for years in his professorships of General, Romance and Italian  at the University of Waseda.

At Waseda University he has been teaching Sardinian courses for 31 years, and to help his students he created the first Sardinian-Japanese vocabulary in 1984. The same dictionary, with the addition of translations into Italian, was published again by the publishing house "Edizioni della Torre" in 2000. For his work, he received the "La Marmora" award (the eighteenth edition) of the Rotary Club of Cagliari and the "Mirto d'Oro defender of the Sardinians" award in 2000.

In 2003 he collaborated with the University of Cagliari, organizing an international conference dedicated to the language and culture of Sardinia at the University of Waseda, thanks to a memorandum of understanding stipulated in 2002.

In 2002 he became a consultant to the Institute of Italian Studies at the University of Waseda.

In 2010 he gave a lectio magistralis at the Ciusa Institute of Nuoro about Sardinian, where he declared himself in favor of an unification and standardization of its orthographies to save it from extinction and he also talked about how he began to know and appreciate it.

Publications 
Shigeaki Sugeta's curriculum vitae is quite extensive, and there are articles and books that deal with the Sardinian, Italian and other romance languages too. This is an (incomplete) list of his publications:

 
 
 
 Shigeaki Sugeta,  Il sintagma nominale del tipo "parola chiave" in italiano e nelle altre lingue romanze (in Italian), edited by Fabio Foresti, Elena Rizzi e Paola Benedini, "Ventesimo Congresso internazionale degli studi", Bologna, 25 -27 September 1986, Roma, 1989.
 
 
 Shigeaki Sugeta, La terza persona singolare del verbo in -T fra le proprietà della lingua sarda (in Italian), "XIX Congresso internazionale della linguistica romanza", La Coruña, 1989, 1993.
 
 Shigeaki Sugeta, Aspetti problematici della lessicalizzazione nelle lingue romanze (in Italian), edited by Paolo Ramat, "XXX Congresso internazionale di studi", Pavia, 26-28 September 1996, Roma, 1998.
 Shigeaki Sugeta, Fattori mediterranei negli esiti romanzi? - a proposito del cambiamento C > G in posizione iniziale (in Italian), "XXI Congresso internazionale della linguistica romanza", Palermo, 1995, Palermo, 1998.
 
 
 Shigeaki Sugeta, Fra la derivazione e la composizione - l'italiano del Novecento fra le lingue romanze (in Italian), "L'italiano oltre frontiera", Lovanio, 1998, Firenze.

References 

Linguists from Japan
Academic staff of Waseda University